Eudonia murana, the Scotch gray or wall grey, is a moth of the family Crambidae. It was described by John Curtis in 1827 and is found in most of Europe.

The wingspan is 18–23 mm. Adults are on wing from June to August, possibly in two generations.

The larvae feed on various mosses growing on rocks and walls, including Hypnum cupressiformis, Dicranum scoparium, Bryum capillare and Grimmia pulvinata.

External links
Fauna Europaea
Swedish Moths
UKMoths

Eudonia
Moths of Europe
Moths described in 1827